Levy Barent Cohen (1747 – 1808) was a Dutch-born British financier and community worker.

Early life
Levy Barent Cohen was born in Amsterdam in 1747. He was the son of Barent Cohen, a wealthy merchant. Cohen was of Ashkenazi-Jewish descent.

Career
Cohen and his brother moved to England where they developed a large business in London. He became known as one of the leading merchants of the city.

Personal life
Cohen was naturalized as a British subject in 1798. He was closely involved in a number of Jewish charities and filled successively all the offices of the Duke's Place Synagogue, the principal Ashkenazi synagogue in London.

He married twice, first to Fanny (née Diamantschleifer) then, after her death, to Fanny's sister, Lydia. He had eight surviving children. Through the marriages his children contracted, including with Nathan Mayer Rothschild and Sir Moses Montefiore, nearly all the leading Jewish families in England were connected with him. In addition, his brother's daughter was Nanette Salomons Cohen, the maternal grandmother of  who, with his son Gerard, founded Philips Electronics.

Death
Cohen died in England in 1808.

References

1747 births
1808 deaths
British bankers
British financial businesspeople
Dutch bankers
British Jews
Dutch emigrants to England
Dutch Jews
British people of Dutch-Jewish descent
Jewish bankers
Businesspeople from Amsterdam
Cohen family